The 1918 Southern Maori by-election was a by-election during the 19th New Zealand Parliament. The election was held on 21 February 1918.

The seat of Southern Maori became vacant following the death of the sitting member Taare Parata on 8 January.

The by-election was won by Hopere Uru.

Uru was Independent, but supported the Reform Party.

Henare Parata was described as the (National) Government nominee, and was a brother of the previous MP Taare Parata.

Results
The following table gives the election results:

References

Southern Maori 1918
1918 elections in New Zealand
Māori politics